Nick Williams (born 2 December 1983) is a retired rugby union player. A number 8, Williams played for North Harbour and the Blues in his native New Zealand, before moving to Europe and playing for Munster, Aironi, Ulster and Cardiff Blues before retiring in 2020.

Career
Williams initially played rugby league, changing to rugby union in his late teens. He then progressed to play for North Harbour as well as representing New Zealand in Under 21's. He then went on to play for the Blues in the Super 14, and was selected for the Junior All Blacks.

Williams played for Munster in the Celtic League and Heineken Cup for two seasons. He made 19 appearances for Munster and scored four tries, including a hat-trick against the Newport Gwent Dragons. He joined Aironi on a one-year deal for the 2010/11 season.

On 22 June 2012, Williams signed for Ulster on a two-year deal after leaving Aironi. On the signing, David Humphreys the Ulster Director of Rugby, said Williams would add a great deal to the Ulster squad. On 23 December 2015, Williams would join Welsh team Cardiff Blues on a three-year contract from the 2016–17 season. Williams retired from rugby in August 2020.

Honours
Munster
Celtic League (1): 2008–09

Cardiff Blues
European Rugby Challenge Cup (1): 2017–18

Junior All Blacks
Pacific Nations Cup (1): 2006

Individual
 Pro12 Player of the Season (1): 2012–13
 IRUPA Players' Player of the Year (1): 2013

Personal life
As one of eight children, Nick grew up in Grey Lynn, Auckland. Williams is the older brother of Clermont Auvergene back Tim Nanai-Williams. He is the first cousin of Blues centre Sonny Bill Williams and the second cousin of boxer Joseph Parker.

References

External links
Munster Profile
Aironi Profile

1983 births
Living people
People educated at Northcote College
New Zealand rugby union players
New Zealand sportspeople of Samoan descent
Blues (Super Rugby) players
North Harbour rugby union players
Munster Rugby players
Ulster Rugby players
Aironi players
Rugby union number eights
New Zealand expatriate rugby union players
Rugby union players from Auckland